De Ingottu Nokkiye is a 2008 Indian Malayalam film by Balachandra Menon starring Jayasurya, Jagathy Sreekumar, Rathish Rajan and Sara. The film released to negative reviews. The film was biggest flop of the 2008.

Plot 
The film is about Vettikadu Sivan, a young, intelligent man who sets out on a mission to settle a score and give a peace of mind to his uncle Vettikadu Sadasivan who is the chief minister of the state.

To do this, Sivan hatches a plan to get the twin brother of Sadasivan who is settled in Gujarat and is an ordinary banana seller and a bit on the lesser side of intelligence.

Sivan gets the banana seller to his state, valiantly kidnaps the real chief minister with the support of his friends, and puts the duplicate in his place. From then on, he keeps guiding the dummy chief minister at all points and the dummy is busy trying to locate his lost love Ammu whom he has adored for a long time.

Cast

Soundtrack 
The soundtrack of the film was composed by M. Jayachandran and lyrics were by Gireesh Puthenchery. The songs are sung by Jassie Gift and  Sangeethaa-Sangeetha Sajith.

References

External links 
 

2008 films
2000s Malayalam-language films
Films scored by M. Jayachandran
Films directed by Balachandra Menon